Nikita Ilyich Haikin (born 11 July 1995) is an Israeli-Russian professional footballer who plays for EFL Championship team Bristol City.

Early life 
Haikin was born in Netanya, Israel, to a family who emigrated from Russia to Israel. His father is businessman Ilya Haikin. In 1997, as a two year old baby, his family moved back with him to Moscow, Russia.

Aside from having Israeli and Russian citizenships, Haikin is also a British national.

Club career
At age of 7 Haikin began his youth career at FSHM Torpedo-Moscow. Nikita was also a part of Dinamo Moscow academy before moving to England.

In September 2013, Haikin went on trial with Reading following his release from Chelsea.
Haikin made his professional debut in the Israeli Premier League for Bnei Yehuda Tel Aviv on 25 February 2017 in a game against Maccabi Tel Aviv.

He then ran out of the contract and joined Hapoel Kfar Saba for one season. 

In March 2019 he signed a contract with Eliteserien club Bodø/Glimt with whom Nikita became a silver medalist in his first season and won, in two consecutive seasons, the Norwegian League championship in 2020 and 2021. Haikin played in the UEFA Europa League where Bodø/Glimt played the likes of Milan at San Siro, AS Roma at the Stadio Olimpico, and Celtic F.C. at Celtic Park.

On 25 January 2023, after being released by Bodø/Glimt, Haikin signed a short-term contract with English Championship club Bristol City until the end of the season.

International career
He has been an international youth, including Russia U-21, for Russia since 2010. 

He was called up to the senior Russia national football team for the first time in October 2021, as part of their World Cup qualifiers against Cyprus and Croatia. He was included in the extended 41-players list of candidates. He was included in the final squad list for these games and was on the bench in both, backing up Matvei Safonov.

Career statistics

Honours 
Bnei Yehuda Tel Aviv
Israel State Cup: 2016–17

Bodø/Glimt
Eliteserien:  2020, 2021

References

External links
 
 
 

1995 births
Living people
Footballers from Netanya
Russian footballers
Israeli footballers
Association football goalkeepers
Russia youth international footballers
Russia under-21 international footballers
Israeli people of Russian descent
Israeli people of Soviet descent
Russian people of Israeli descent
FC Sibir Novosibirsk players
Marbella FC players
FC Mordovia Saransk players
FC Kuban Krasnodar players
Bnei Yehuda Tel Aviv F.C. players
Hapoel Kfar Saba F.C. players
FK Bodø/Glimt players
Israeli Premier League players
Liga Leumit players
Eliteserien players
Israeli expatriate footballers
Expatriate footballers in Spain
Expatriate footballers in Norway
Israeli expatriate sportspeople in Spain
Russian expatriate sportspeople in Spain
Russian expatriate sportspeople in Norway
Bristol City F.C. players
Expatriate footballers in England
Russian expatriate sportspeople in England
C.D. Nacional players
Chelsea F.C. players
Dynamo Moscow players
FC FShM Torpedo Moscow players
Portsmouth F.C. players
Reading F.C. players